The Ministry of Trade, Industry and small-and-middle-sized Businesses (ministère du Commerce, de l’industrie et des petites et moyennes entreprises) is a  Guinean government ministry. The current minister is Bernard Gomou.

Officeholders since 2010

References 

Trade ministries
Politics of Guinea
Government ministries of Guinea